Fallout is a series of post-apocalyptic role-playing video games—and later action role-playing games—created by Interplay Entertainment. The series is set during the 21st, 22nd and 23rd centuries, and its atompunk retrofuturistic setting and art work are influenced by the post-war culture of 1950s United States, with its combination of hope for the promises of technology and the lurking fear of nuclear annihilation. A forerunner of Fallout is Wasteland, a 1988 game developed by Interplay Productions to which the series is regarded as a spiritual successor.

The series' first title, Fallout, was developed by Black Isle Studios and released in 1997, and its sequel, Fallout 2, the following year. With the tactical role-playing game Fallout Tactics: Brotherhood of Steel, development was handed to Micro Forté and 14 Degrees East. In 2004, Interplay closed Black Isle Studios, and continued to produce Fallout: Brotherhood of Steel, an action game with role-playing elements for the PlayStation 2 and Xbox, without Black Isle Studios. Fallout 3, the third entry in the main series, was released in 2008 by Bethesda Softworks, and was followed by Fallout: New Vegas, developed by Obsidian Entertainment. Fallout 4 was released in 2015, and Fallout 76 released on November 14, 2018.

Bethesda Softworks owns the rights to the Fallout intellectual property. After acquiring it, Bethesda licensed the rights to make a massively multiplayer online role-playing game (MMORPG) version of Fallout to Interplay. The MMORPG got as far as beta stage under Interplay, but a lengthy legal dispute between Bethesda Softworks and Interplay halted the development of the game and led to its eventual cancellation, as Bethesda claimed in court that Interplay had not met the terms and conditions of the licensing contract. The case was settled in early 2012.

Origins 
The ideas of the Fallout series began with Interplay Productions' Wasteland, released in 1988. At that time, Interplay was not a publisher and used Electronic Arts for distribution of the game. According to Interplay's founder, Brian Fargo, they wanted to explore a post-apocalyptic setting and created Wasteland for that. Sometime after release, Interplay decided to shift focus and become a publisher while still developing games. Fargo wanted to continue to use the Wasteland intellectual property but could not negotiate the rights back from Electronic Arts. Still wanting to do something in a post-apocalyptic setting, Fargo and his team decided to make a new setting and game. They determined what aspects of Wasteland were positives and wrote and developed a new game around them. The result was the first Fallout games, which released nearly ten years after Wasteland.

Games

Main series

Fallout (1997) 

Released in October 1997, Fallout takes place in a post-apocalyptic Southern California, beginning in the year 2161. The protagonist, referred to as the Vault Dweller, is tasked with recovering a water chip in the Wasteland to replace the broken one in their underground shelter home, Vault 13. Afterwards, the Vault Dweller must thwart the plans of a group of mutants, led by a grotesque entity named the Master. Fallout was originally intended to run under the GURPS role-playing game system. However, a disagreement with the creator of GURPS, Steve Jackson, over the game's violent content required Black Isle Studios to develop the new SPECIAL system. Fallouts atmosphere and artwork are reminiscent of post-World War II United States during the Cold War era and the fear that the country was headed for nuclear war in the real world.

Fallout 2 (1998) 

Fallout 2 was released in October 1998, with several improvements over the first game, including an improved engine, the ability to set attitudes of non-player characters (NPC) party members and the ability to push people who are blocking doors. Additional features included several changes, including significantly more pop culture jokes and parodies, such as multiple Monty Python and The Hitchhiker's Guide to the Galaxy-referencing special random encounters, and self-parodying dialogue that broke the fourth wall to mention game mechanics. Fallout 2 takes place eighty years after Fallout, and centers around a descendant of the Vault Dweller, the protagonist of Fallout. The player assumes the role of the Chosen One (Vault Dweller's actual grandchild) as they try to save their village, Arroyo, from famine and droughts. After saving the village, the Chosen One must fight the Enclave, the remnants of the pre-war United States government (as well as the shadow government in charge of the vault project).

Fallout 3 (2008) 

Fallout 3 was developed by Bethesda Game Studios and released on October 28, 2008. The story picks up thirty years after the setting of Fallout 2 and 200 years after the nuclear war that devastated the game's world. The player-character is a Vault dweller in Vault 101 who is forced to flee when the Overseer tries to arrest them in response to their father leaving the Vault. Once out, the player is dubbed the Lone Wanderer and ventures into the Wasteland in and around Washington, D.C., known as the Capital Wasteland, to find their father. It differs from previous games in the series by utilizing 3D graphics, a free-roam gaming world, and real-time combat, in contrast to previous games' 2D isometric graphics and turn-based combat. It was developed for the PC, Xbox 360 and PlayStation 3 using the Gamebryo engine. It received highly positive reviews, garnering 94/100, 92/100, and 93/100 averages scores on Metacritic for the PC, PS3 and Xbox 360 versions of the game, respectively. It won IGN's 2008 Overall Game of the Year Award, Xbox 360 Game of the Year, Best RPG, and Best Use of Sound, as well as E3's Best of the Show and Best Role Playing Game.

Fallout 4 (2015) 

Fallout 4, developed by Bethesda Game Studios, was released on November 10, 2015. The game was released for Microsoft Windows, PlayStation 4 and Xbox One and takes place in Boston, Massachusetts, of the in-game New England Commonwealth and features voiced protagonists. The Xbox One version has been confirmed to have mods . Bethesda also confirmed mods for PlayStation 4, after lengthy negotiations with Sony. A virtual reality version of the game was released on December 11, 2017, available on SteamVR. Fallout 4 takes place in the year 2287, ten years after the events of Fallout 3. Fallout 4s story begins on the day the bombs dropped: October 23, 2077. The player's character (voiced by either Brian T. Delaney or Courtenay Taylor), dubbed as the Sole Survivor, takes shelter in Vault 111, emerging 210 years later, after being subjected to suspended animation. The Sole Survivor goes on a search for their son who was taken away from the Vault.

Fallout 5 (TBA) 
In June 2022, Todd Howard stated in an interview that Fallout 5 would begin development after the completion of The Elder Scrolls VI, with an unspecified release window.

Spin-offs

Fallout: New Vegas (2010) 

Fallout: New Vegas was developed by Obsidian Entertainment and released on October 19, 2010. The development team included developers who previously worked on Fallout and Fallout 2. Fallout: New Vegas is not a direct sequel to Fallout 3. Events follow four years after Fallout 3 and offer a similar experience, but no characters from that game appear. The player assumes the role of a courier in the post-apocalyptic world of the Mojave Wasteland. As the game begins, the Courier is shot in the head and left for dead shortly before being found and brought to a doctor in the nearby town of Goodsprings, marking the start of the game and the Courier's search for their would-be murderer. The city of New Vegas is a post-apocalyptic interpretation of Las Vegas.

Fallout 76 (2018) 

Fallout 76 is the first online multiplayer game in the franchise. It is set in West Virginia, with a majority of monsters and enemies based on regional folklore. When the game was originally released there were no human non-player characters in the game, although with the "Wastelanders" update it received NPCs and character dialogue. It was released for Microsoft Windows, PlayStation 4, and Xbox One on November 14, 2018.

Other games 
These games were considered non-canon when Bethesda Softworks acquired the license. However, the canonicity status of Fallout Tactics is complex; despite the original Bethesda statement, multiple Bethesda-era games refer to its events.

Fallout Tactics: Brotherhood of Steel (2001) 

Fallout Tactics: Brotherhood of Steel is the first Fallout game not to require the player to fight in a turn-based mode, and the first to allow the player to customize the skills, perks, and combat actions of the rest of the party. Fallout Tactics focuses on tactical combat rather than role-playing; the new combat system included different modes, stances, and modifiers, but the player had no dialogue options. Most of the criticisms of the game came from its incompatibility with the story of the original two games, not from its gameplay. Fallout Tactics includes a multiplayer mode that allows players to compete against squads of other characters controlled by other players. Unlike the previous two games, which are based in California, Fallout Tactics takes place in the Midwestern United States. The game was released in early 2001 to generally favorable reviews.

Fallout: Brotherhood of Steel (2004) 

Fallout: Brotherhood of Steel became the first Fallout game for consoles when it was released in 2004. It follows an initiate in the Brotherhood of Steel who is given a suicidal quest to find several lost Brotherhood Paladins. Brotherhood of Steel is an action role-playing game, representing a significant break from previous incarnations of the Fallout series in both gameplay and aesthetics. The game does not feature non-player characters that accompany the player in combat and uses heavy metal music, including Slipknot, Devin Townsend, and Killswitch Engage, which stands in contrast to the music of the earlier Fallout games, performed by The Ink Spots and Louis Armstrong. It was the last Fallout game developed by Interplay.

Fallout Shelter (2015) 

Fallout Shelter is a simulation game for Microsoft Windows, iOS, Android, Xbox One, PlayStation 4 and Nintendo Switch. The player acts as the Overseer, building and managing their Vault and its dwellers, sending them into the Wasteland on scouting missions and defending the Vault from attacks. Unlike the main entries in the franchise, this game has no ending and mostly revolves around attempting to keep the people who live in the vault, an intricate fallout shelter, alive. The game uses microtransactions, a form of in game purchases, that take the form of nuka-cola quantum, the game's "premium" currency, lunch boxes, an item that would give a random mixture of in-game items, pet carriers, something that would contain a pet, which can boost a single dweller's stats, and "mister handys", a robot who could harvest the games materials or be assigned to outside the vault to harvest bottle caps, the games currency. Fallout Shelter was released for iOS on June 14, 2015, Android on August 13, 2015, and for PC on July 15, 2016. On February 7, 2017, Bethesda launched Fallout Shelter on Xbox One. On June 10, 2018, Bethesda announced and launched Fallout Shelter on Nintendo Switch and PlayStation 4.

Fallout Pinball (2016) 
In late 2016, Zen Studios developed a virtual pinball game based on the Fallout universe as part of the Bethesda Pinball collection, which became available as part of Zen Pinball 2, Pinball FX 2 and Pinball FX 3, as well as a separate free-to-play app for iOS and Android mobile devices. The pinball adaptation is based on Fallout 4, while containing elements from previous installments as well.

Cancelled games

Fallout Extreme 
Fallout Extreme was in development for several months in 2000 but was canceled before leaving the concept stage. It was intended to be a squad-based, first and third-person tactical shooter to be released on Xbox and built on Unreal Engine.

Fallout Tactics 2 
Fallout Tactics 2 was proposed as a sequel to Fallout Tactics: Brotherhood of Steel, although it was originally conceived as a sequel to Wasteland, the video game that inspired the Fallout series. It was developed by Micro Forté, but the production was canceled in December 2001 after the poor sales of Fallout Tactics.

Van Buren, Black Isle Studios' Fallout 3

Van Buren is the codename for the canceled version of Fallout 3 developed by Black Isle Studios and published by Interplay Entertainment. It featured an improved engine with real 3D graphics as opposed to sprites, new locations, vehicles, and a modified version of the SPECIAL system. The story disconnected from the Vault Dweller/Chosen One bloodline in Fallout and Fallout 2. Plans for the game included the ability to influence the various factions. The game was canceled in December 2003 when the budget cuts forced Interplay to dismiss the PC development team. Interplay subsequently sold the Fallout intellectual property to Bethesda Softworks, who began development on their own version of Fallout 3 unrelated to Van Buren. Main parts of the game were incorporated into Fallout 3 and its add-ons as well as Fallout: New Vegas.

Fallout: Brotherhood of Steel 2 
Fallout: Brotherhood of Steel 2 is the canceled sequel to Brotherhood of Steel. The development of the game started before the completion of the original, and its development caused the cancellation of the Van Buren project. Like its predecessor, the game would have used the Dark Alliance Engine. It featured fourteen new weapons and ten new enemies. The game would have used a simplified reputation system based on previous entries; depending on whether the player was good or evil, the game would play out differently. Each of the four characters that were playable had a different fighting style, therefore every new play-through would have been a different experience. It had two player co-op action for players to experience the game with their friends. The Dark Alliance Engine would be fleshed out to refine player experience. A new stealth system would have been added to the game. This system would have allowed players to stalk enemies or stealthily assassinate them with a sniper rifle. For characters that could not use the sniper rifle, Interplay added a turret mode allowing those characters to use turrets.

While the main quest of the game would have been linear, how the player reach the conclusion would have been their choice. The main character would have been a Latino girl named Lilith, who was said to have a short temper with short black hair, green eyes and a sexy body. She would have worn a sports bra and jeans. Three other characters would be Maxus, the son of Cyrus, and Jaffe, a Brotherhood R&D worker who was pulled from duty due to Brotherhood/NCR tensions. Scarlet was a character that is completely albino, she was raised by Harold and inspired by the stories of Dweller, the main character of the original Fallout.

Fallout Online 

Fallout Online (previously known as Project V13) is a canceled project by Interplay and Masthead Studios to develop a Fallout-themed massively multiplayer online game. It entered production in 2008. In 2009, Bethesda filed a lawsuit against Interplay regarding Project V13, claiming that Interplay has violated their agreement as development has not yet begun on the project. On January 2, 2012, Bethesda and Interplay reached a settlement, the terms of which include the cancellation of Fallout Online and transfer of all rights in the franchise to Bethesda. Since then, Project V13 has been revived as a completely different project called Mayan Apocalypse, unrelated to Fallout.

Gameplay

SPECIAL 

SPECIAL is a character creation and statistics system developed specifically for the Fallout series. SPECIAL is an acronym, representing the seven attributes used to define Fallout characters: Strength, Perception, Endurance, Charisma, Intelligence, Agility and Luck. SPECIAL is heavily based on GURPS, which was originally intended to be the character system used in the game.

The SPECIAL system involves the following sets of key features:

 Attributes (listed above) represent a character's core, innate abilities. Attributes stay largely constant throughout the game, though they can be temporarily affected by drugs, altered indefinitely by conditions such as the wearing of Power Armor, the presence of certain NPCs or eye damage received in a critical hit, or permanently changed at certain points in the game through use of certain items or by taking certain perks.
 Skills represent a character's chance of successfully performing a group of specific tasks (such as firing a gun, or picking a lock). They are represented as percentages, though these percentages can extend well beyond the expected maximum of 100%, at increased cost for skills over 100%. The SPECIAL stats continually add bonuses to skills. This is done passively, i.e. if the SPECIAL stats change, the bonuses are automatically and instantly adjusted. Skill Points that are earned each time the character levels up can be used to raise skill percentage. At character creation, the player selects three "tag skills" — skills which can be increased at multiples of the normal rate, starting at one skill point per 2% skill at under 101% skill.

The SPECIAL system was used in Fallout, Fallout 2, and Fallout Tactics: Brotherhood of Steel. A modified version of the system was used in Fallout 3, Fallout: New Vegas, Fallout 4 and Fallout Shelter.

Aside from Fallout games, modified versions of SPECIAL were also used in Lionheart: Legacy of the Crusader (also referred to as Fallout Fantasy early in production), a fantasy role-playing video game that involved spirits and magic in addition to the traditional SPECIAL features, as well as the canceled project Black Isle's Torn.

The Pip-Boy and Vault Boy 

The Pip-Boy (Personal Information Processor-Boy) is a wrist-computer given to the player early in Fallout, Fallout 2, Fallout 3, Fallout: New Vegas, Fallout 4, and Fallout 76 which serves various roles in quest, inventory, and battle management, as well as presenting player statistics. The model present in Fallout and Fallout 2 is identified as a Pip-Boy 2000, and both games feature the same unit, used first by the Vault Dweller and later inherited by the Chosen One. Fallout Tactics contains a modified version of the 2000 model, called Pip-Boy 2000BE, while Fallout 3 and Fallout: New Vegas uses a Pip-Boy 3000. Fallout: New Vegas has a golden version of it, called the Pimp-Boy 3 Billion that is given to the player as a reward for completing a quest in a certain way. Fallout 4 contains a modified version of the 3000, called the Pip-Boy 3000 Mark IV. Fallout 76 contains a modified version of the Pip-Boy, called the Pip-Boy 2000 Mark VI, which is another version of the Pip-Boy 2000.

The Vault Boy character is Vault-Tec's mascot, and is a recurring element in Vault-Tec products in the game world. This includes the Pip-Boy, where the Vault Boy illustrates all of the character statistics and selectable attributes. From Bethesda's Fallout 3 onward Vault Boy models all of the clothing and weaponry as well. The character was originally designed by Leonard Boyarsky, based partly on Rich Uncle Pennybags' aesthetic from the Monopoly board game.

Series overview

Setting 

The series is set in a fictionalized United States in an alternate history scenario that diverges from reality after 1945, following World War II. In this alternative atompunk "golden age", vacuum tubes and atomic physics serve as the foundations of scientific progress, while transistors are not as scientifically important in this world. As such, a bizarre socio-technological status quo emerges, in which advanced robots, nuclear-powered cars, directed-energy weapons, and other futuristic technologies are seen alongside 1950s-era computers and televisions. The United States divides itself into 13 commonwealths and the aesthetics and Cold War paranoia of the 1950s continue to dominate the American lifestyle well into the 21st century.

More than a hundred years before the start of the series, an energy crisis emerged caused by oil depletion, leading to a period called the "Resource Wars" in April 2052 – a series of events which included a war between the European Commonwealth and the Middle Eastern states, the disbanding of the United Nations, the U.S. invasion of Mexico and annexation of Canada, and a Chinese invasion and subsequent military occupation of Alaska coupled with their release of the "New Plague" that devastated the American mainland. As global situations worsened, the American government became increasingly jingoistic and authoritarian, going as far as having dissidents sent off to re-education camps and experimentation. Tensions between the United States and China eventually culminated in the "Great War" on the morning of October 23, 2077, eastern standard time, a two-hour nuclear exchange on an apocalyptic scale, which subsequently created the post-apocalyptic United States, the setting of the Fallout world.

Vaults 

Having foreseen this outcome decades earlier, the U.S. government began a nationwide project in 2054 to build fallout shelters known as "Vaults". The Vaults were ostensibly designed by the Vault-Tec Corporation as public shelters, each able to support up to a thousand people. Around 400,000 Vaults would have been needed, but only 122 were commissioned and constructed. Each Vault is self-sufficient, so they could theoretically sustain their inhabitants indefinitely. However, the Vault project was not intended as a viable method of repopulating the United States in these deadly events. Instead, most Vaults were secret, unethical social experiments and were designed to determine the effects of different environmental and psychological conditions on their inhabitants. Experiments were widely varied and included: a Vault filled with clones of an individual; a Vault where its residents were frozen in suspended animation; a Vault where its residents were exposed to psychoactive drugs; a Vault where one resident, decided by popular vote, is sacrificed each year; a Vault with only one man and puppets; a Vault where its inhabitants were segregated into two hostile factions; two Vaults with disproportionate ratios of men and women; a Vault where the inhabitants were exposed to the mutagenic Forced Evolutionary Virus (F.E.V.); and a Vault where the door never fully closed, exposing the inhabitants to the dangerous nuclear fallout. 17 control Vaults were made to function as advertised in contrast with the Vault experiments but were usually shoddy and unreliable due to most of the funding going towards the experimental ones. Subsequently, many Vaults had their experiments derailed due to unexpected events, and several Vaults became occupied by raiders or mutants.

Post-War conditions 

In the years after the Great War, the United States has devolved into a post-apocalyptic environment commonly dubbed "the Wasteland". The Great War and subsequent nuclear Armageddon had severely depopulated the country, leaving large expanses of property decaying from neglect. In addition, virtually all food and water is irradiated and most lifeforms have mutated due to high radiation combined with mutagens of varied origins. Despite the large-scale devastation, some areas were fortunate enough to survive the nuclear apocalypse relatively unscathed, even possessing non-irradiated water, flora, and fauna. However, these areas are exceedingly rare. With a large portion of the country's infrastructure in ruins, basic necessities are scarce. Barter is the common method of exchange, with bottle caps providing a more conventional form of currency. Most cities and towns are empty, having been looted or deserted in favor of smaller, makeshift communities scattered around the Wasteland.

Many humans who could not get into the Vaults survived the atomic blasts, but many of these, affected by the radiation, turned into so-called "ghouls". While their lifespans are greatly extended, their bodies develop widespread necrosis or rot; many lose their hair, their voices take on a raspy tone, and otherwise have permanently deformed physical features. Ghouls often resent normal human beings, either out of jealousy or in response to discrimination. Ghouls typically resent any comparison to zombies, and being called a zombie is viewed as a great insult. If ghouls continue to be exposed to high radiation levels, their brains experience irreversible damage, which can caused them to become "feral" and attack almost anything on sight, having lost their minds. 

Creatures known as "Deathclaws" roam the wilderness. They were deliberately created by humans as biological weapons prior to the Great War. Escaping into the wild afterwards, they went on to thrive in the nuclear wasteland, becoming apex predators. Known as one of the Fallout series' most recognizable and iconic elements, Deathclaws were praised by critics for their design and the fear they induce in the player due to their immense power. As a result of their popularity, numerous mods were created for Fallout series games with the Deathclaw as a central theme, either to tame the creatures as a pet or use them in combat, concepts which were later added as an official feature.

Various factions of humans would later form in the Wasteland, with three of the most prominent being the Brotherhood of Steel, the New California Republic (NCR), and the Enclave. The Brotherhood came together when a group of soldiers led by U.S. Army Captain Roger Maxson started a mutiny after finding out about the Forced Evolutionary Virus experiments. Declaring themselves independent from the U.S. government, their rebellion never got off the ground due to the Great War beginning. The defectors, safe in the underground confines of the base, survived and came to the surface and reconnected with other survivors, then headed to the Lost Hills bunker to start anew. The NCR was formed by a group of Vault 15 dwellers who would go on to found the town of Shady Sands. Over time under the leadership of their elder Aradesh and his daughter Tandi, Shady Sands became a major economic power in the southwest and united with other major hubs of civilization in the area to found the New California Republic. The Enclave was a secret cabal of wealthy industrialists, members of the military, and influential politicians who operated in the shadows and held a great degree of control over the United States' government. This enigmatic alliance of private interests eventually subverted and developed from the continuity of government protocol to ensure its survival as the real America, laying claim to the North American mainland.

Influences 
Fallout satirizes the 1950s’ and 1960s’ fantasies of the United States' "post-nuclear-war-survival", thus draws from 1950s pulp magazine science fiction and superhero comic books, all rooted in Atomic Age optimism of a nuclear-powered future, though gone terribly awry by the time the events of the game take place. The technology is retro-futuristic, with various Raygun Gothic machines such as laser weaponry and boxy Forbidden Planet-style robots. Computers use vacuum tubes instead of transistors (of which only a few exist), the architecture of ruined buildings feature Art Deco, Streamline Moderne, and Googie designs, direct-energy weapons resemble those used by Flash Gordon, and what few vehicles remain in the world are all 1950s-styled. Fallouts other production designs, such as menu interfaces, are similarly designed to resemble advertisements and toys of the Atomic Age. Advertising in the game such as billboards and brochures has a distinct 1950s motif and feel. The lack of retro-stylization was a common reason for criticism in spin-off games, as well as modern features on weapons and other models.

A major influence was A Boy and His Dog, where the main character Vic and his dog Blood scavenge the desert of the Southwestern United States, stealing for a living and evading bands of marauders, berserk androids, and mutants. It "inspired Fallout on many levels, from underground communities of survivors to glowing mutants." Other film influences include the Mad Max series, with its depiction of a post-apocalyptic wasteland. In the first game, one of the first available armors is a one-sleeved leather jacket that resembles the jacket worn in Mad Max 2.

Tabletop games

Fallout: Warfare 

Fallout: Warfare is a tabletop wargame based on the Fallout Tactics storyline, using a simplified version of the SPECIAL system. The rulebook was written by Christopher Taylor, and was available on the Fallout Tactics bonus CD, together with cut-out miniatures. Fallout: Warfare features five distinct factions, vehicles, four game types and 33 different units. The rules only require ten-sided dice. The modifications to the SPECIAL system allow every unit a unique set of stats and give special units certain skills they can use, including piloting, doctor, and repair. A section of the Fallout: Warfare manual allows campaigns to be conducted using the Warfare rules. It has been chosen for many awards and won game of the year.

Fallout 
A board game titled Fallout was announced by Fantasy Flight Games in 2017 for a November release.

Fallout: Wasteland Warfare 
The tabletop wargame Fallout: Wasteland Warfare was announced by Modiphius Entertainment in April 2017. It was released in March 2018.

A virtual tabletop version was released on Fantasy Grounds April 26, 2022.

Fallout: The Roleplaying Game 
The tabletop role-playing game Fallout: The Roleplaying Game, also by Modiphius Entertainment, was released digitally on March 31, 2021. The game features a modified version of the SPECIAL system, including the seven SPECIAL stats, skills, tag skills, and perks. Its core mechanic is Modiphius's "2d20" system, a dice pool system in which any given action is resolved by rolling two twenty-sided dice and counting the number of "successes", which are any result equal to or below the character's combined SPECIAL attribute plus their skill rank for a particular action. Players can roll additional dice by spending "Action Points", a resource shared by all active players in the game, which are generated and spent continuously over the course of a game session.

The game's default setting is the Commonwealth, the same as in Fallout 4, at the same period in time. Flavor text throughout the rulebook describe characters featured in Fallout 4 and suggest that events are set to occur the same way they are at the beginning of the videogame, such as the arrival of the Prydwen airship. The rulebook contains descriptions of locations, fictional corporations, factions, and events specific to the default greater Boston area. Support for regions that appeared in other Fallout videogames, such as the Capital Wasteland, New Vegas, or Southern California, was not included in the core rulebook.

Other media

Canceled films
In 1998, Interplay Entertainment founded the film division Interplay Films to make films based on its properties, and announced that a Fallout film was one of their first projects, along adaptations of Descent and Redneck Rampage. In 2000, Interplay confirmed that a film based on the original Fallout game was in production with Mortal Kombat: Annihilation screenwriter Brent V. Friedman attached to write a film treatment and with Dark Horse Entertainment attached to produce it. The division was later disbanded without any film produced, but Friedman's treatment was leaked on the Internet in 2011.

In 2009, Bethesda Softworks expressed its interest in producing a Fallout film. After four extensions of the trademark without any use, Bethesda filed a "Statement of Use" with the USPTO in January 2012. In the next month, instead of a Fallout film, a special feature was made, entitled "Making of Fallout 3 DVD", which was accepted as a film on March 27 of the same year. This action removed the requirement to continue to re-register that mark indefinitely. In the DVD commentary of Mutant Chronicles, voice actor Ron Perlman stated that if a Fallout film was made, he would like to reprise his role as the Narrator. In 2016, Todd Howard stated that Bethesda had turned down the offers of making a film based on Fallout, but that he did not rule out the possibility.

Television series

A Fallout television series based on the franchise was announced in July 2020. The series is created by Lisa Joy and Jonathan Nolan for Amazon Prime Video. The duo will also be writing and executive producing the series with their production company, Kilter Films, working alongside Bethesda Softworks and Bethesda Game Studios. Alongside Joy and Nolan, Kilter Films' Athena Wickham, Bethesda Softworks' James Altman, and Bethesda Game Studios' Todd Howard will also be executive producing the series. In January 2022, Amazon officially moved forward with the series, with Nolan set to direct the pilot episode and Geneva Robertson-Dworet and Graham Wagner joining as showrunners. Filming is set to occur later in the year. Walton Goggins and Ella Purnell have been cast in lead roles.

Reception and legacy 

The Fallout series has been met with mostly positive reception. The highest rated title is Fallout 3 and the lowest is Fallout 76 according to review aggregator Metacritic.

Controversy and fandom 
Many fans have expressed dismay at the direction the Fallout series has taken since its acquisition by Bethesda Softworks. Notorious for their vehement support of the series' first two games, Fallout and Fallout 2, members centered around one of the oldest Fallout fansites, No Mutants Allowed, have cried foul over departures from the original games' stories, gameplay mechanics and setting. Minor criticisms include the prevalence of unspoiled food after 200 years, the survival of wood-framed dwellings after a nuclear blast, and the ubiquity of Super Mutants at early levels in the game. More serious criticisms involve the quality of the game's writing, lack of verisimilitude, the switch to a first-person action game format, and the reactiveness of the surrounding game world to player actions. In response, Jim Sterling of Destructoid has called fan groups like No Mutants Allowed "selfish" and "arrogant"; stating that a new audience deserves a chance to play a Fallout game; and that if the series had stayed the way it was back in 1997, new titles would never have been made and brought to market. Luke Winkie of Kotaku tempers these sentiments, saying that it is a matter of ownership; and that in the case of Fallout 3, hardcore fans of the original series witnessed their favorite games become transformed into something else and that they are "not wrong" for having grievances.

The redesigned dialogue interface featured in Fallout 4 received mixed reception by the community. Unsatisfied fans created mods for the game, providing subtitles and allowing the player to know what their character would say before choosing it as it was in previous games in the franchise such as in Fallout 3 and Fallout: New Vegas. Though even taking the mods into account, Patricia Hernandez of Kotaku still criticized the writing of the game in her review, describing it as "thin", "You never have particularly long or nuanced conversations with the other characters. I like to play a Charisma-focused character, and I was disappointed."

Upon release, Fallout 76 became the lowest rated title in the series due to its mixed reception and criticisms from reviewers. It has been the subject of several controversies since its release. IGN gave the game a five out of ten rating, criticizing the game for its lackluster graphics, poor use of multiplayer, and bugs, "Fallout 76 fails to do any of it well enough to form an identity. Its multiplayer mindset robs its quests of all the moral decisionmaking that makes the series great, and all that’s left is a buggy mess of systemic designs that never seems to work (culminating) in an aggravating endgame that’s more busywork than satisfying heroics. Bethesda missed the mark with Fallout 76...because it seems it could never decide what it was aiming for." The magazine, PC Gamer, rated the game a six out of ten, praising it for its evocative and beautiful setting, large world, and combat but also criticizing the game for its bugs, poor UI, and repetitiveness, "the world retains a lot of what I love about Bethesda's previous RPGs with finely crafted environments, enjoyable weapons and crafting, and surprising little scraps of story to uncover and investigate. Like Valley Galleria, though, it doesn't take long to for the shine to fade, the once-fascinating areas to lose their wonder among the mobs of identical enemies I've killed there time and time again."

Legal action 
Interplay was threatened with bankruptcy and sold the full Fallout franchise to Bethesda, but kept the rights to the Fallout MMO through a back license in April 2007 and began work on the MMO later that year. Bethesda Softworks sued Interplay Entertainment for copyright infringement on September 8, 2009, regarding the Fallout Online license and selling of Fallout Trilogy and sought an injunction to stop development of Fallout Online and sales of Fallout Trilogy. Key points that Bethesda were trying to argue is that Interplay did not have the right to sell Fallout Trilogy on the Internet via Steam, Good Old Games or other online services. Bethesda also said that "full scale" development on Fallout Online was not met and that the minimum financing of 30 million of "secured funding" was not met. Interplay launched a counter suit claiming that Bethesda's claims were meritless and that it did have the right to sell Fallout Trilogy via online stores via its contract with Bethesda. Interplay also claimed secure funding had been met and the game was in full scale development by the cut off date. Interplay argued to have the second contract that sold Fallout voided which would result in the first contract that licensed Fallout to come back into effect. This would mean that Fallout would revert to Interplay. Bethesda would be allowed to make Fallout 5. Bethesda would have to pay 12% of royalties on Fallout 3, Fallout: New Vegas, Fallout 4 and expansions plus interest on the money owed. On December 10, 2009, Bethesda lost the first injunction.

Bethesda shortly afterward tried a new tactic and fired its first lawyer, replacing him and filing a second injunction, claiming that Interplay had only back-licensed the name Fallout but no content. Interplay has countered showing that the contract states that they must make Fallout Online that has the look and feel of Fallout and that in the event Interplay fails to meet the requirements (30 million minimum secure funding and "full scale" development by X date) that Interplay can still release the MMO but they have to remove all Fallout content. The contract then goes on to list all Fallout content as locations, monsters, settings and lore. Bethesda has known that Interplay would use Fallout elements via internet emails shown in court documents and that the contract was not just for the name. The second injunction by Bethesda was denied on August 4, 2011, by the courts. Bethesda then appealed the denial of their second preliminary injunction. Bethesda then sued Masthead Studios and asked for a restraining order against the company. Bethesda was denied this restraining order before Masthead Studios could call a counter-suit. Bethesda lost its appeal of the second injunction.

Bethesda filed motion in limine against Interplay. Interplay filed a motion in limine against Bethesda the day after. The trial by jury which Bethesda requested on October 26, 2010, was changed to a trial by court because the APA contract stated that all legal matters would be resolved via a trial by court and not a trial by jury. The trial by court began on December 12. In 2012, in a press conference Bethesda revealed that in exchange for 2 million dollars, Interplay gave to them full rights for Fallout Online. Interplay's rights to sell and merchandise Fallout, Fallout 2 and Fallout Tactics: Brotherhood of Steel expired on December 31, 2013.

See also 
Exodus, a role-playing game previously associated with the Fallout intellectual property during its development.

Notes

References

Further reading

External links 

 
Fallout wiki

 
Microsoft franchises
Dieselpunk
Video games set in the United States
Military of the United States in fiction
Post-apocalyptic video games
Human experimentation in fiction
Open-world video games
Satirical video games
Retrofuturistic video games
Alternate history video games
Video games adapted into television shows
Video games about nuclear war and weapons
Video game franchises introduced in 1997
World War III video games
Role-playing video games by series